Maghreb cuisine is the cooking of the Maghreb region, the northwesternmost part of Africa along the Mediterranean Sea, consisting of the countries of Algeria, Libya, Mauritania, Morocco, and Tunisia. 

Well-known dishes from the region include couscous, pastilla, and tajine stew.

Origins

The cuisine of the Maghreb, the western region of North Africa that includes Algeria, Morocco, Tunisia and Libya, as well as Mauritania, is by origin Berber. The cuisines of Algeria, Tunisia and Libya have also been influenced by French and Italian cuisine respectively.

Cuisine
In Maghrebi cuisine, the most common staple foods are wheat (for khobz bread and couscous), fish, seafood, goat, lamb, beef, dates, almonds, olives and various vegetables and fruits.

Because the region is predominantly Muslim, halal meats are usually eaten. Most dishes are spiced.

The use of legumes, nuts, fruits and spices is very prominent. Salt-preserved lemons (l'hamd mrakad) and so-called "oil-cured" olives are distinctive elements of the cuisine.

The best-known Maghrebi dish abroad is couscous, made from wheat semolina. The tajine, a cooking vessel made of clay of Berber origin, is also a common denominator in this region, although the dishes and preparation methods vary widely. For example, a tajine in Tunisia is a baked quiche-like dish, whereas in Morocco it is a slow-cooked stew. Pastilla is also an important Andalusian dish of the region.

Spices
Spices found in this region's cuisine are ginger, allspice, caraway, saffron, paprika, cloves, cumin, coriander, cayenne pepper and turmeric. Fresh peppermint, parsley, or coriander are also very common. Spice mixtures such as ras el hanout, baharat, and chili pastes like harissa (especially in Tunisia) are frequently used.

Image gallery

See also

 List of African cuisines
 List of African dishes

References

External links

 
Mediterranean cuisine
North African cuisine
West African cuisine